"Mastermind" is a song by American singer-songwriter Taylor Swift, released on October 21, 2022, as the final track on the standard edition of her tenth studio album, Midnights (2022). Written and produced by Swift and Jack Antonoff, the track has lyrics confessing to a lover about the habit of meticulously initiating and planning a romantic relationship. The production consists of swirling arpeggiators, layered vocal harmonies, and expansive bass. The track peaked within the top-20 in Australia, Canada, Malaysia, the Philippines, Singapore, and the United States, and peaked at number 13 on the Billboard Global 200. It was performed for the first time on the Eras Tour (2023).

Background and release 
American singer-songwriter Taylor Swift announced her tenth studio album, Midnights, at the 2022 MTV Video Music Awards on August 28. On a video via her Instagram account on September 6, 2022, titled "The making of Midnights", Swift revealed that Jack Antonoff, who had worked with her before on her five studio albums since 1989 (2014), was the producer on the album. Starting from September 21, 2022, exactly a month before Midnights's release, she announced a thirteen-episode short series called Midnights Mayhem with Me on the social media platform TikTok. The series' purpose is to announce a song title every episode by rolling a lottery cage containing thirteen ping pong balls numbered one to thirteen, each ball representing a track. "Mastermind" was the first track title Swift revealed.

Composition and lyrics 
"Mastermind" is a subdued electropop song with a duration of three minutes and eleven seconds. In line with other Midnights tracks, it incorporates a bleeping electronic groove, swirling synth arpeggiators, an expansive bass, and layered vocal harmonies. The bridge features cinematic strings. Ilana Kaplan from the Alternative Press compared the opening synths to the "jittery" introduction of the Who's song "Baba O'Riley" (1971).

The lyrics are about reflecting upon one's past and declaring that the protagonist is the mastermind behind everything that happened. The song opens with, "Once upon a time, the planets and the fates and all the stars aligned/ You and I ended up in the same room at the same time", which Time interpreted as a throwback to Swift's 2008 single "Love Story", in that both reference William Shakespeare's trope of star-crossed lovers. Throughout the verses, Swift's character paints herself as the grandmaster scheming a plan to "assess the equation of you". The refrain contrasts with the theme of love guided by fate and destiny on Swift's past songs (such as "Invisible String" or "Long Story Short") and asserts that "none of it was accidental", depicting the narrator as the person responsible for everything that has happened ("What if I told you I’m a mastermind? And now you’re mine/ It was all by design").

Some critics commented that the song's confessional and openly personal sentiments are representative of Midnight's overarching lyrical theme. Jon Caramanica from The New York Times described the track as Swift's "villain origin story", highlighting the lyrics, "No one wanted to play with me as a little kid/ So I've been scheming like a criminal ever since/ To make them love me and make it seem effortless." Hannah Mylrea from NME considered the cited lyrics a personal revelation that only comes to light "in the wee hours". According to The A.V. Club's Saloni Gajjar, the track also makes fun of Swift's public image and dating history. In a review for the Los Angeles Times, Mikael Wood wrote that in addition to being a confession of Swift's love life, "Mastermind" is also about her career maneuver from a teenage country musician to a global pop star ("I laid the groundwork/ and then just like clockwork/ the dominoes cascaded in a line").

Commercial performance
Upon the release of Midnights, all 13 tracks of the standard edition debuted inside the top-15 of the Billboard Global 200 chart simultaneously; "Mastermind" was at number 13. In the United States, it debuted and peaked at number 13 on the Billboard Hot 100. The song peaked at number 12 on the Canadian Hot 100 and was certified gold from Music Canada on November 24, 2022. "Mastermind" appeared on record charts of various territories, at number 12 in Australia, number 13 in the Philippines, number 14 in Singapore, number 18 in Malaysia, number 33 in Portugal and Vietnam, number 51 in Lithuania, number 52 in Czech Republic, number 56 in Sweden, number 62 in Slovakia, and number 80 in Spain.

Credits and personnel 
Credits are adapted from Pitchfork.
Recording
 Recorded at Rough Customer Studio (Brooklyn) and Electric Lady Studios (New York City)
 Mixed at MixStar Studios (Virginia Beach)
 Mastered at Sterling Sound (Edgewater, New Jersey)
 Bobby Hawk's performance was recorded by Jon Gautier at Sound House Studios (Lakeland, Florida)
 Evan Smith's performance was recorded by herself at Pleasure Hill Recording (Portland, Maine)
 Zem Audu's performance was recorded by himself at Audu Music Studio (Brooklyn)
 Michael Riddleberger's performance was recorded by himself at Moultrie Studios (Brooklyn)
 Mikey Freedom Hart's performance was recorded by David Hart at Big Mercy Sound (Brooklyn)

 Personnel
 Taylor Swift – vocals, songwriter, producer
 Jack Antonoff – songwriter, producer, recording, drums, programming, percussion, Juno, Minimoog, electric guitars, background vocals
 Evan Smith – synths, saxophone, recording
 Bobby Hawk – violin
 Zem Audu – saxophone, recording
 Michael Riddleberger – drums
 Mikey Freedom Hart – programming, Minimoog
 Megan Searl – assistant engineer
 Jon Sher – assistant engineer
 John Rooney – assistant engineer
 Serban Ghenea – mixing engineer
 Bryce Bordone – assistant mix engineer
 Randy Merrill – mastering engineer
 Laura Sisk – recording
 Jon Gautier – recording
 David Hart – recording

Charts

Certifications

References 

2022 songs
Songs written by Taylor Swift
Songs written by Jack Antonoff
Song recordings produced by Taylor Swift
Song recordings produced by Jack Antonoff
Taylor Swift songs
Electropop songs